Kuichong Subdistrict  is a township-level division situated in Shenzhen, Guangdong, China.

Education
Secondary schools ("middle schools"):
 Kuichong Middle School (葵涌中学)
 Shenzhen School (High School) Affiliated to Renmin University of China (人大附中深圳学校)

Nine-year schools (elementary and junior high schools):
 Shenzhen Yadi School  (亚迪学校) in Kuichong Town
 Xingyu School (星宇学校) in Gaoyuan Community
 Shenzhen School Affiliated to Renmin University of China (人大附中深圳学校)

Primary schools:
 Kuichong Central Primary School (葵涌中心小学) - Kuichong
 Kuichong No. 2 Primary School (葵涌第二小学)
 Xichong Primary School (溪涌小学)

See also
Dapeng Peninsula
Mirs Bay
List of township-level divisions of Guangdong

References

Kuichong
Subdistricts of Shenzhen